RK/Rkay is a 2021 Indian Hindi-language comedy-drama film written and directed by Rajat Kapoor, starring himself with Mallika Sherawat, Kubbra Sait, Ranvir Shorey and Manu Rishi Chadha. The film appeared at international festivals, including Shanghai International Film Festival, Austin Film Festival.

Cast 
Rajat Kapoor as RK/Mahboob
Mallika Sherawat as Gulabo/Neha
Ranvir Shorey as KN Singh/Ranvir
Kubbra Sait as Seema
Chandrachoor Rai as Namit
Manu Rishi Chadha as Goel

Release
The film appeared at several film festivals. and then was scheduled to release theatrically on 22 July 2022.  It premiered in the US on 14 May 2021

Critical response 

RK/RKay received generally positive reviews. On review aggregator Rotten Tomatoes, the film has a 83% approval rating based on 12 reviews, with an average rating of 6.40/10.
RK/Rkay  opened to immense critical appreciation. Most critics praised all the performances and the deeply rich whimsical script.

Renuka Vyavhare of Times of India gave 3/5 stars and called it "a delightful game of hide and seek between real and fiction".

Outlook went with 4/5 stars stating that it is "a thorough entertainer".

Tanul Thakur of The Wire adorned RK/RKay review by asserting, RK/RKay' Is a Genie of Genius Filmmaking – And Can't Be Caught in a Bottle.

Saibal Chatterjee of NDTV India gave 3/5 stars stating, "It might not exactly send you into paroxysms of delight, but the film thrives on a steady flow of wry wit and humour - and flashes of vitality".

Poulomi Das of News9Live gave 4/5 stars stating, "There are films that blow your mind and there are films that make you impossibly grateful for the medium. RK/RKay is both those films and so much more".

Nidhima Taneja of ThePrint gave 3.5/5 stars stating, "Rajat Kapoor’s RK/RKay is more than a film—it’s a genre-bending treat"

Suparana Sharma of Rolling Stone India gave 3/5 stars stating, "Rajat Kapoor’s new film toys with our mind, and is that rare sort of Bollywood movie that makes us think & At other times I thought RK/Rkay was bringing to life what Rajesh Khanna had said in Anand: “Hum sab toh rangmanch ki kathputhliyan hain jinki dor uparwale ke haath mein…” And during some scenes my mind drifted to strange thoughts – what if we are not watching the films, but the films are watching us." 

Film companion said, "RK/RKay is a Delightful meta caper on the egotism of storytelling & it's undoubtedly a conscientious independent effort that succeeds in creating a cultish impression." 

Sabina Dana Plasse of Film Threat gave 8/10 stars stating, "RK/RKay presents a great appreciation for the artistry required to make a film."

Newsgram gave 4/5 stars saying that 'RK/RKay' is a delight for cinema lovers.

Jay Weissberg of Variety enunciated, "Rajat Kapoor's RK/RKay is enjoyable comedy set in the film world that makes for pleasant entertainment."

Udita Jhunjhunwala of Firstpost wrote, "RK/RKay is an enjoyable and whimsical film which is homage and wistful tribute to the meta world it inhabits".

Anupama Chopra said, "RK/RKay is enjoyable to watch & Director Rajat Kapoor imagines a world in which boundaries between fact & fiction are porous".

References

External links
 
 

2021 films
2021 comedy-drama films
Indian comedy-drama films
2020s Hindi-language films